The Funston Limestone is a geologic formation in Kansas. It preserves fossils dating back to the Permian period.

See also

 List of fossiliferous stratigraphic units in Kansas
 Paleontology in Kansas

References
 

Permian Kansas